Alloknesis is an abnormal sensory state where stimuli that do not ordinarily evoke itch (such as the light touch of clothing) cause itch.

References

Symptoms and signs of mental disorders